Simon Labouyrie (born 15 October 1991) is a French professional rugby union player. He plays at hooker for Bayonne.

References

External links
Ligue Nationale De Rugby Profile
European Professional Club Rugby Profile
Bayonne Profile

Living people
1991 births
French rugby union players
Rugby union hookers
Aviron Bayonnais players
US Dax players
Union Sportive Bressane players